During the season, A.S. Roma competed in Serie A, Coppa Italia and UEFA Cup.

Squad

(captain)

Competitions

Serie A

League table

Matches

Coppa Italia

First round

Eightfinals

Quarterfinals

UEFA Cup

First round

Second round

Eightfinals

Quarterfinals

External links

References

A.S. Roma seasons
Roma
Italian football championship-winning seasons